Jambavade is a village in India, situated in Mawal taluka of Pune district in the state of Maharashtra.

Administration
The village is administrated by a sarpanch, an elected representative who leads a gram panchayat. In 2019, the village was itself the seat of a gram panchayat.

Demographics
At the 2011 Census of India, the village comprised 136 households. The population of 784 was split between 399 males and 385 females.

See also
List of villages in Mawal taluka

References

Villages in Mawal taluka